William Wells House, also known as the "Stone House" or "Stonehurst," is a historic home located at Tyler City, Tyler County, West Virginia. It was built about 1801–1804, and is a modest 2-story sandstone residence.  The house is nearly square and has an unusually large interior chimney. A Victorian-style frame addition was built about 1895 at the rear of the house. It is recognized as the county's oldest house. Also located on the property is the family burial ground where Wells' grave marker stands.

It was listed on the National Register of Historic Places in 1987.

References

Houses in Tyler County, West Virginia
Houses completed in 1801
Houses on the National Register of Historic Places in West Virginia
Stone houses in West Virginia
National Register of Historic Places in Tyler County, West Virginia
Sandstone houses in the United States